This is a list of professional wrestling promotions in New Zealand and lists both active and defunct professional wrestling promotions.

List

New Zealand Wrestling Promotions

See also

Professional wrestling in New Zealand
List of professional wrestling promotions

References

External links
 NZPWI
 Wrestling Titles - New Zealand

Promotions
New Zealand sport-related lists
Promotions in New Zealand